Pinkafeld Airport is a private use airport located  north-northwest of Pinkafeld, Burgenland, Austria.

See also
List of airports in Austria

References

External links 
 Airport record for Pinkafeld Airport at Landings.com

Airports in Austria
Burgenland